This is a list of Estonian television related events from 1971.

Events

Debuts

Television shows

Ending this year

Births
27 January - Karin Tammaru, actress 
14 February - Karmel Eikner (:et), TV host
16 June - Eva Püssa, actress 
3 November - Piret Laurimaa, actress 
16 November - Annely Peebo, mezzo-soprano and host of Eurovision Song Contest 2002
6 December  - Katariina Unt, actress
25 December - Ain Mäeots, actor and director

Deaths